Codes for electromagnetic scattering by cylinders – this article list codes for electromagnetic scattering by a cylinder.

Majority of existing codes for calculation of electromagnetic scattering by a single cylinder are based on Mie theory, which is an analytical solution of Maxwell's equations in terms of infinite series.

Classification
The compilation contains information about the electromagnetic scattering by cylindrical particles, relevant links, and applications.

Codes for electromagnetic scattering by a single homogeneous cylinder

Relevant scattering codes
 Discrete dipole approximation codes
 Codes for electromagnetic scattering by spheres

See also
 Computational electromagnetics
 List of atmospheric radiative transfer codes

References

External links
SCATTERLIB: Collection of light scattering codes

Science-related lists
Scattering, absorption and radiative transfer codes